Prince Hermann von Hatzfeldt, Duke of Trachenburg (4 February 1848, Trachenberg – 14 January 1933) was a German nobleman, member of the House of Hatzfeld, civil servant and politician. He represented the Deutsche Reichspartei in the Reichstag for a number of years.

Early life 
Hermann von Hatzfeld was the son of the 2nd Prince Hermann Anton von Hatzfeld-Trachenberg, (1808–1874), and his second wife, Countess Marie von Nimptsch (1820–1897). He was born in Trachenberg Castle, Silesia.

Honours
He received the following orders and decorations:

References

External links

1848 births
1933 deaths
People from Żmigród
People from the Province of Silesia
German Roman Catholics
Free Conservative Party politicians
Members of the 4th Reichstag of the German Empire
Members of the 5th Reichstag of the German Empire
Members of the 6th Reichstag of the German Empire
Members of the 7th Reichstag of the German Empire
Members of the 8th Reichstag of the German Empire
Members of the 12th Reichstag of the German Empire
Members of the Prussian House of Lords
Inter-Allied Rhineland High Commission
Major generals of Prussia
German people of World War I
House of Hatzfeld
Bailiffs Grand Cross of Honour and Devotion of the Sovereign Military Order of Malta
Knights Grand Cross of the Order of Saints Maurice and Lazarus
Knights Grand Cross of the Order of Pope Pius IX